Rolleston Hall was a country house originally built in the early 17th century in Rolleston-on-Dove, Staffordshire which had been substantially renovated after a fire in 1871 and was demolished in 1928.

History
A house had stood on the Rolleston site, owned by the Rolleston family, since the early 13th century. In 1622 the estate was purchased by Sir Edward Mosley (or Mosely), Attorney-General of the Duchy of Lancaster. He replaced a wooden house with a stone-built one and died unmarried in 1638, after which the property passed to his nephew Sir Edward Mosley, 1st Baronet and in turn to his son, Sir Edward Mosley, 2nd Baronet. It later devolved to Oswald Mosley, (High Sheriff of Staffordshire for 1715), who was created a baronet (the second creation of the title) in 1720. The property then passed down to John Parker Mosley, who was also created a baronet (the third creation of the title) in 1781.

During the ownership of Sir Tonman Mosley, 3rd Baronet in 1871 the hall was devastated by fire and subsequently rebuilt to a higher standard. The last Mosley to be connected with Rolleston Hall was Sir Oswald Mosley, the 6th Baronet and well-known founder of the British Union of Fascists (BUF). He was the Labour M.P. for Harrow from 1918 to 1924 and for Smethwick from 1926 to 1931. The estate however was sold in his father's lifetime in 1923 and after unsuccessful efforts to sell the hall it was largely demolished in 1928. Some remnants were converted into flats.

The GWR Hall Class locomotive 5973 "Rolleston Hall" was named after the house.

See also
 Mosley Baronets

References

 
 

Country houses in Staffordshire
Buildings and structures demolished in 1928